Shuffle! Love Rainbow is the fourth eroge visual novel in the Shuffle! series created by Navel for Microsoft Windows. It is a continuation of Kaede's path from Really? Really! or Sia's path from Shuffle! Essence+, or Primula's path from Shuffle! Last storyline is the Ruri Matsuri's path, which takes place at the same time as the storylines from Shuffle!

Gameplay
When player starts the game he can only chose three paths:  Sia's,  Primula's and  Kaede's. Each storyline is an after story, Kaede's path takes place at the time of school festival, in Primula's path the main heroine would like be seen more like a girl not a kid, in the third storyline Sia and Kikyou have a few problems. When the player finishes the first three paths, he can play the last one. In the fourth storyline we follow the story of Ruri, which is a romantic story like the paths from Shuffle!, and it's quite different from  Ruri's side story from Shuffle! Essence+. In this game we chose only which story we want to follow, we don't have any choices while playing the path.

Characters

Main characters

 Rin  The protagonist of the previous games. The player assumes the role of Rin.

 Kaede  The main female character of the second story. She wants to go to the school festival with Rin.

 Primula  The main female character of the third story. She wants Rin to think of her as a girl.

 Sia  The main female character of the first story. She just wants to be with Rin.
  
 Ruri  The main female character of the fourth story. She falls in love with Rin, but is really shy, which is why their romance needs time to develop. This is the first game with Ruri's H (hentai) scenes.

Secondary characters

 Nerine  The King of Devils' daughter and Sia's cousin.

 Asa  Rin and Kaede's friend from school.

 Kareha   Asa and Ruri's classmate and friend.

 Mayumi  Rin and Kaede's classmate and bad friend.

 Itsuki  Rin and Kaede's classmate and bad friend.

 Nadeshiko  Rin and Kaede's homeroom teacher.

 Daisy  Sia's cousin on her father's side.

Music
Opening Theme: Summer Again, by YURIA.

Ending Theme: Primary, by Miyuki Hashimoto.

External links
 Official site

Bishōjo games
Eroge
Japan-exclusive video games
Shuffle!
Video games developed in Japan
Visual novels
Windows games
Windows-only games
2011 video games
Navel (company) games